This is a list of all results of ŠK Slovan Bratislava in European football.

Overall record
Accurate as of 9 March 2023

Legend: GF = Goals For. GA = Goals Against. GD = Goal Difference.

Results

Non UEFA-administered competition

See also
Slovak clubs in European football

References

External links
 Slovan Bratislava profile at the Union of European Football Associations

ŠK Slovan Bratislava
Slovak football clubs in international competitions